Julien Auguste John Eugène Durand (25 May 1874 – 10 September 1973) was a French lawyer and Radical politician.
He was briefly Minister of PTT in 1930, and was Minister of Commerce and Industry in 1932–33.
He authored the first proposal for what became the 1937 International Exposition of Art and Technology in Modern Life.

Early years

Julien Auguste John Eugène Durand was born on 25 May 1874 in Naples, Italy.
He received his secondary education from the Marist Brothers in Besançon and then at the lycée in Brest.
He studied law at the Faculty of Dijon, and in 1900 enrolled in the bar of Besançon.
He later became president of the bar.
He specialized in civil and commercial law.
He was elected to the municipal council of Besançon in 1908.
During World War I (1914–18) he served as a lieutenant with the 64th Infantry Regiment, and then at the headquarters of the 129th Infantry Division.
He was awarded the Croix de Guerre.

Political career

Durand ran for election to the legislature in the general elections of 16 November 1919 on the Democratic Union list, but was not successful.
While still a municipal councilor for Besançon, and from 1922 a general councilor for the Doubs department, he was elected to the legislature in the general elections on 11 May 1924.
He ran on the Left Cartel list, and joined the Radical and Radical Socialist group in the chamber of deputies.
He joined the committees on Civil & Criminal Legislation, and Commerce & Industry.
From 1926 he chaired the committee on commerce & industry.
He was a Freemason, as were many French politicians in inter-war period.

Durand was reelected in the second round in the general elections of 22–29 April 1928.
He joined the committees on Customs and Commerce & Industry.
In December 1929 Durand submitted a proposal for a decorative arts exposition similar to the 1925 International Exposition of Modern Industrial and Decorative Arts. 
He said that this exposition had helped France's balance of trade, spread French taste and fostered collaboration between artists and manufacturers.
However, after the Wall Street Crash of 1929 there was less interest in a purely aesthetic exhibition, and more in one that focused on international cooperation.

Durand was Minister of Posts, Telegraphs, and Telephones from 21 February 1930 to 2 March 1930 in the short-lived cabinet of Camille Chautemps.
In the autumn of 1930 he chaired a committee that studied the organization of a European postal union.
In 1931 he was appointed to the board of the Office of Foreign Trade, while chairing the committee on commerce and industry.
He was reelected in the second round in the general elections on 1–8 May 1932, and was appointed Minister of Commerce and Industry when the cabinet of Édouard Herriot was formed on 3 June 1932.
Durand participated in the Lausanne conference on German reparations in June 1932.
The British wanted to cancel German reparations, while the French were unwilling to go further than suspension, which was agreed.
In October 1932 Durand's proposal for an exposition of the arts was combined with two others to form the basis for the 1937 Exposition Internationale des Arts et Techniques dans la Vie Moderne.
Durand retained his ministry in the cabinet of Joseph Paul-Boncour from 18 December 1932 until its fall on 28 January 1933.

Later career

Durand was defeated in the April–May 1936 general elections.
He was appointed to the Paris Court of Appeal, and was president of the court when he retired in 1941.
Julien Durand died in Paris on 10 September 1973 at the age of 99.
He was a commander of the Legion of Honour.

Publications

Notes

Sources

1874 births
1973 deaths
19th-century Neapolitan people
Radical Party (France) politicians
French Ministers of Posts, Telegraphs, and Telephones
French Ministers of Commerce and Industry
Members of the 13th Chamber of Deputies of the French Third Republic
Members of the 14th Chamber of Deputies of the French Third Republic
Members of the 15th Chamber of Deputies of the French Third Republic